Thyrsodium herrerense is a species of tree in the family Anacardiaceae. It is endemic to Peru.

References

Trees of Peru
herrerense
Vulnerable plants
Taxonomy articles created by Polbot